This is a list of number-one songs in the United States during the year 1941 according to The Billboard.

The National Best Selling Retail Records chart was the first to poll retailers nationwide on record sales.

The new chart was advertised as a trade service feature, based on the "10 best selling records of the past week" at a selection of national retailers from New York to Los Angeles.

Shown is a list of songs that topped the National Best Selling Retail Records chart in 1941.

See also
1941 in music

References

1941
1941 record charts
1941 in American music